HMS Princess Irene was a  ocean liner which was built in 1914 by William Denny and Brothers Ltd, Dumbarton, Scotland for the Canadian Pacific Railway. She was requisitioned by the Royal Navy on completion and converted to an auxiliary minelayer. On 27 May 1915, she exploded and sank off Sheerness, Kent, while being loaded with mines prior to a deployment mission, with the loss of 352 lives.

Description

History
Princess Irene was built by William Denny and Brothers Ltd, Dumbarton, for the Princess fleet of the Canadian Pacific Railway Coast Service. Her hull was launched on 20 October 1914.  With her sister ship , she was built to serve on the Vancouver – Victoria – Seattle route. Her port of registry was Victoria. Princess Irene was requisitioned by the Royal Navy on her completion in 1915 and converted to an auxiliary minelayer. She had a complement of 225 officers and men. On 8 May 1915, Princess Irene and Princess Margaret laid a minefield northwest of Heligoland, with Princess Irene laying 472 mines.

Loss
In May 1915, Princess Irene was moored in Saltpan Reach, on the Medway Estuary in Kent between Port Victoria and Sheerness, being loaded with mines in preparation for deployment on a minelaying mission. At 11:14 GMT on 27 May, she exploded and disintegrated. Two barges lying alongside her were also destroyed. The explosion was larger than that which had destroyed  in the Medway six months earlier, although the loss of life was less. A total of 352 people were killed, including 273 officers and men, and 76 dockyard workers who were on board Princess Irene. On the Isle of Grain a girl of nine was killed by flying débris, and a farmhand died of shock. A collier half a mile (800 m) away had its crane blown off its mountings. A part of one of Princess Irene'''s boilers landed on the ship; a man working on the ship died from injuries sustained when he was struck by a piece of metal weighing .

Severed heads were found at Hartlip and on the Isle of Grain. A 10-ton (10,160 kg) section of the ship landed on the Isle of Grain. The Admiralty's oil storage tanks there were damaged. The sole survivor from Princess Irene was a stoker, who suffered severe burns. Three of her crew had a lucky escape as they were ashore at the time.

The victims whose bodies were recovered were buried at Woodlands Road Cemetery, Gillingham. A memorial service for the victims was held at the Dockyard Church, Sheerness on 1 June 1915. It was led by Randall Davidson, the Archbishop of Canterbury. Inquests were held on two victims of the disaster. The coroner stated that he did not intend to hold an inquest for any other victim unless there were exceptional circumstances that warranted it.

A Court of Inquiry was held into the loss of Princess Irene. Evidence was given that priming of the mines was being carried out hurriedly and by untrained personnel. A faulty primer was blamed for the explosion. A worker at Chatham Dockyard was named as a suspect, but a thorough investigation by Special Branch cleared him of any blame.

Memorials

A memorial to those lost on Bulwark and Princess Irene was erected at the Dockyard Church, Sheerness in 1921. It was dedicated by Archdeacon Charles Ingles, the Chaplain of the Fleet. It was unveiled by Hugh Evan-Thomas, Commander-in-Chief, The Nore. Victims of both ships are also commemorated on the Naval War Memorial at Southsea.

Another memorial was placed in Woodlands Road Cemetery, Gillingham, as part of the Naval Burial Ground.

Media coverage
On 19 November 2002, the story of Princess Irene was covered by BBC Radio Four's Making History programme.

References

Sources

Further reading

External links
 BBC Radio Four Making History programme covering the loss of Princess Irene (UK only)

1914 ships
Ships built on the River Clyde
World War I merchant ships of Canada
Steamships of Canada
Minelayers of the Royal Navy
Steamships of the United Kingdom
Maritime incidents in 1915
Maritime disasters in Kent
Borough of Swale
1915 in England
Ships sunk by non-combat internal explosions
World War I shipwrecks in the North Sea
Auxiliary ships of Canada
1915 disasters in the United Kingdom